Hodgleigh is a rural locality in the South Burnett Region, Queensland, Australia. In the  Hodgleigh had a population of 137 people.

History 
The name Hodgleigh was originally used a railway station name assigned by the Queensland Railways Department on 15 March 1911, after Queensland politician Robert Samuel Hodge.

Horse Creek Provisional School opened on 18 February 1902. In 1907 it was renamed Bell Bird Provisional School. On 1 January 1909 it became Bell Bird State School. In 1923 it was renamed Hodgleigh State School. It closed on 4 November 1956.

In the  Hodgleigh had a population of 137 people.

References 

South Burnett Region
Localities in Queensland